Guards! Guards! is a fantasy novel by British writer Terry Pratchett, the eighth in the Discworld series,  first published in 1989. It is the first novel about the Ankh-Morpork City Watch. The first Discworld point-and-click adventure game borrowed heavily from the plot of Guards! Guards!

Plot

The story follows a plot by a secret brotherhood, the Unique and Supreme Lodge of the Elucidated Brethren of the Ebon Night, to overthrow the Patrician of Ankh-Morpork and install a puppet king, under the control of the Supreme Grand Master. Using a stolen magic book, they summon a dragon to strike fear into the people of Ankh-Morpork.

Once a suitable state of terror and panic has been created, the Supreme Grand Master proposes to put forth an "heir" to the throne, who will slay the dragon and rid the city of tyranny. It is the task of the Night Watch – Captain Vimes, Sergeant Colon, Corporal Nobbs, and new volunteer Carrot Ironfoundersson – to stop them, with some help from the Librarian of the Unseen University, an orangutan trying to get the stolen book back.

The Watch is generally regarded as a bunch of incompetents who walk around ringing their bells without accomplishing anything. Carrot's arrival changes this; Whereas the existing officers are either cynical, incompetent, mildly crooked or all three, Carrot is honest, straightforward and idealistic. Having memorized the Laws and Ordinances of the Cities of Ankh and Morpork, on his first day he tries to arrest the head of the Thieves' Guild for theft (the Thieves' Guild is permitted a quota of legally licensed thieving, a concept that the book of ancient Laws does not take into account). Brought up as a dwarf – dwarves are a literal, dutiful people – Carrot has an absolute dedication and conscientiousness that unnerve his colleagues who view them as bordering on the suicidal in the face of the reality of Ankh-Morpork life. Carrot's policing style is reminiscent of traditional idealized portrayals of British police, but astoundingly, it actually seems to work.

Carrot's enthusiasm strikes a chord with Vimes, who decides that the Watch should try to carry out its ostensible duties. Vimes begins investigating the dragon's appearances, which leads to an acquaintance with Sybil Ramkin, a breeder of swamp dragons. Ramkin gives an underdeveloped dragon, Errol, to the Watch as a mascot.

The leader of the Elucidated Brethren is initially successful in controlling the dragon, but he has not accounted for the dragon's own abilities. The banished dragon returns, and makes itself king of Ankh-Morpork (keeping the head of the Elucidated Brethren as its mouthpiece) and demands that the people of Ankh-Morpork bring it gold and regular virgin sacrifices, whilst preparing for an "ambitious and vigorous" foreign policy, aimed at subjugating Ankh-Morpork's neighbours.

Shortly after, Vimes is imprisoned in the same cell as the Patrician, who has been leading a relatively comfortable life with the help of the rats he uses as spies. The Librarian helps Vimes to escape and he runs to the aid of Sybil, who has been chosen as the first maiden to be sacrificed.  The Watch's swamp dragon, Errol, reorganises his digestive system to form a supersonic propulsion system and fights the king, eventually knocking it out of the sky with a shock wave. As the assembled crowd closes in on the king for the kill, Sybil tries to plead for the dragon's life. Carrot instead places it under arrest, however Errol lets the dragon escape, revealing that the dragon is in fact female, the battle between the two being a courtship ritual.

Sam Vimes proceeds to arrest the Supreme Grand Master (Lupine Wonse, the Patrician's secretary) but accidentally causes the man's death when he tells Carrot to "throw the book at him." The man was attempting to summon another dragon, and dies from falling off a broken floor after being hit by the Laws and Ordinances of Ankh-Morpork.

The Patrician is reinstated as ruler of Ankh-Morpork, and offers the Watch anything they want as a reward. They ask only for a modest pay raise, a new tea kettle, and a dartboard.  However, the Watch House at Treacle Mine Road was destroyed by the dragon. Lady Ramkin donates her childhood home at Pseudopolis Yard as the new Watch House.

Characters

Carrot Ironfoundersson
Samuel Vimes
Fred Colon
Nobby
Havelock Vetinari
Lupine Wonse
The Elucidated Brethren of the Ebon Night
Sybil Ramkin

Reception
John Clute, writing in 1990, noted that Pratchett's decision to address serious topics risked damaging the Discworld's potential for comedy, "which Pratchett writes with something like genius", and particularly faulted Lord Vetinari's monologue on the nature of evil (which Clute described as Realpolitik and Weltschmerz): although Clute conceded that the monologue had been skilfully written, he felt that it "has all the ring of another sphere of discourse" and "comes close to shattering the comic pulse of the Discworld".

National Public Radio described Guards! Guards! as a "solid entryway" into the Discworld novels.

Adaptations
The novel has been adapted as:
 a six-episode serial on BBC Radio 4 (23 November  - 28 December  1992) dramatised by Michael Butt and starring John Wood (Vimes), Melvyn Hayes (Nobby), Robert Gwilym (Carrot), Crawford Logan (Vetinari), Helen Atkinson-Wood (Lady Ramkin), Brett Usher (Supreme Grand Master), Martin Jarvis (narrator).
 a stage play for the amateur stage scripted by Stephen Briggs (1993) (script later published in book form 1997).
 a professional stage play scripted by Geoffrey Cush and starring Paul Darrow (1998).
 a "Big Comic" (Graphic novel) drawn by Graham Higgins and based on Briggs' script (2000).
 an audio play presented live at Dragon*Con in 2001, adapted by David Benedict and performed by the ARTC (Atlanta Radio Theatre Company).  In appreciation, the ARTC made a donation to the Orangutan Foundation International.
 a video game loosely based on the plot of the book, with Rincewind substituted for Sam Vimes.
 a Board Game - officially launched at Titancon, Belfast 24 September 2011 by Backspindle Games (Designers: Leonard Boyd & David Brashaw) in conjunction with Z-Man Games, USA. The game includes 90 Discworld character illustrations drawn by Stephen Player and respective text quotes from over twenty Discworld novels.

Translations
Стражите! Стражите! (Bulgarian)
Stráže! Stráže! (Czech)
Wacht! Wacht! (Dutch)
Vahid! Vahid! (Estonian)
Vartijat, hoi! (Finnish)
Au Guet ! (French)
Wachen! Wachen! (German)
שומרים! שומרים! (Shomrim! Shomrim!) (Hebrew)
Őrség! Őrség! (Hungarian)
A me le guardie! (Italian)
I lovens navn! (In the name of the law) (Norwegian)
Straż! Straż! (Polish)
Guardas! Guardas!  (Portuguese - Brazil)
Gărzi! Gărzi! (Romanian)
Стража! Стража! (Russian)
Straža! Straža! (Serbian)
¡Guardias! ¿Guardias? (Spanish)
I lagens namn (In the name of the law) (Swedish)
Muhafızlar! Muhafızlar! (Turkish)
來人啊! (繁體中文)
卫兵！卫兵！(简体中文)
Варта! Варта! (Ukrainian)
Guàrdies, guàrdies! (Catalan)

References

External links

 
 Annotations for Guards! Guards!
 Quotes from Guards! Guards!
 Discworld reading order - The Watch

1989 British novels
Discworld books
British comedy novels
British fantasy novels
1989 fantasy novels
British novels adapted into television shows
Novels adapted into comics
Victor Gollancz Ltd books